Redacted is a 2007 American war film written and directed by Brian De Palma. It is a fictional dramatization, loosely based on the 2006 Mahmudiyah killings in Mahmoudiyah, Iraq, when U.S. Army soldiers raped an Iraqi girl and murdered her along with her family. This film, which is a companion to an earlier film by De Palma, 1989's Casualties of War, was shot in Jordan.

Redacted premiered at the 2007 Venice Film Festival, where it earned a Silver Lion Best Director award. It was also shown at the Toronto International Film Festival, the New York Film Festival and the Buenos Aires International Festival of Independent Cinema. The film opened in Spain, and in fifteen theaters in limited release in the United States on November 16, 2007. The film received mixed reactions from critics and a poor financial response in its limited U.S. release.

Plot
In April 2006, Private First Class Angel Salazar (Izzy Diaz), a young United States Army soldier serving in the Iraq War, is an aspiring filmmaker who enlisted in the U.S. Army to help him get into film school, following the rejection of his application to University of Southern California. Salazar, based in Camp "The Oven" Carolina, near Samarra, Iraq, is using his camcorder to record an amateur documentary, Tell Me No Lies, about his deployment in Samarra, to present to a film school of choice as part of admission. Meanwhile, a French documentary crew is shooting a documentary called Barrage while they are embedded with Salazar's platoon.

The French documentary crew films the soldiers performing their routine duties as they man a random checkpoint as part of their deployment in Iraq, to help curtail insurgent activity. The soldiers spend their days searching cars at the checkpoint. One day, the French documentary videotapes an incident in which Private First Class Reno Flake (Patrick Carroll), while manning a Humvee-mounted M2 machine gun, fires on a speeding car that tries to rush through the checkpoint. A pregnant female passenger in the car is shot and is rushed to the hospital by her brother, and later dies. It is later revealed that the brother, the driver of the car, was simply trying to get his pregnant sister to the hospital, as she was in labor, and misinterpreted the soldiers' commands to stop, believing that they were telling him that he was clear to proceed.

Back at Camp Carolina, Salazar, camcorder in hand, asks Flake how he felt about killing a pregnant woman, and he replies that he felt "nothing", and that it was like "gutting catfish". When Specialist Lawyer McCoy (Rob Devaney), a married, college-educated soldier, is disgusted by this response, Salazar and McCoy press the issue further, and Flake offers a sarcastic, facetious apology to Salazar's camcorder, enjoying the limelight, which further inflames the situation. Sergeant Jim Vazquez (Mike Figueroa) defuses the situation before it gets out of hand, stating that, under the rules of engagement, Flake's actions were proper.

While on a foot patrol, one of the more experienced soldiers, Master Sergeant Sweet, is killed after stepping on an improvised explosive device. Flake and his friend SPC B.B. Rush (Daniel Stewart Sherman) are enraged by Sweet's death and wish to take revenge by attacking some Iraqis. During a poker game, Flake and Rush announce their plan to go to the house of an Iraqi family they had searched previously, with the goal of raping a 15-year-old girl who is one of the family members. Despite objections from Blix and McCoy, Flake and Rush carry out their plan, with Salazar and McCoy accompanying them; the former to videotape the incident and the latter in the hopes of stopping them.

McCoy tries to stop the duo, but he is ordered out of the house at gunpoint. Flake and Rush rape the girl as Salazar films the events using a hidden helmet-mounted video camera. Afterwards, the girl and her entire family are killed and the girl is burned. McCoy tries to tell Blix about the rape, when Rush confronts the two and threatens McCoy at knife-point, demanding he not report the rape. Afterwards, McCoy is deeply disturbed by the rape and murders, and he tells his father about the incident via webchat. His father, citing the Abu Ghraib incident, urges him not to report the incident, fearing the publicity generated would disparage the U.S. internationally. Regardless, McCoy ignores his father's objections and reports the rape, going to the Criminal Investigation Division (CID) to make them aware of the crimes and they subsequently interview him. Salazar too is disturbed by the scenes he recorded, and he meets with an Army psychologist to discuss his deteriorating mental state.

While busy making a video for his mother during a foot patrol, a preoccupied Salazar is kidnapped by insurgents at knife-point and driven away in a van. Rush notices Salazar missing and his camera, which was left behind during the kidnapping. Later, Salazar is beheaded alive by the insurgents and a video of his murder uploaded onto the internet. Before beheading him, the insurgents claim that his beheading was retribution for Farah's rape. Salazar's decapitated corpse is discovered by a Bedouin man and subsequently retrieved by U.S. soldiers. The Army alleges the rape and murder were perpetrated by insurgents, but a relative rejects the claim, stating that they are of the same sect as the supposed insurgents. After the story makes the news, Flake and Rush are arrested and interrogated by the CID and the duo conceitedly admit to the rapes in rambling racist rants.

In October 2006, after returning home from Iraq, McCoy is at a bar with his wife when he is asked by his civilian friends to tell them a "war story". He obliges and tearfully tells them about the rape and murders, before sobbing into his wife's arms.

Cast
 Izzy Diaz as PFC Angel "Sally" Salazar, USA:  An aspiring filmmaker who enlisted in the military to help him get into film school. Using his camcorder, he decides to shoot a homemade movie about his deployment in Iraq, to increase his chances of getting enrolled. After two of his fellow platoon mates rape Farrah, a teenage Iraqi schoolgirl, and murders her and her family, Salazar is kidnapped by the Mujahideen Shura Council and al-Qaeda in Iraq (AQI) while videotaping himself on a foot patrol, and subsequently beheaded in revenge. His death has a profound effect on SPC Lawyer McCoy, causing him to report the crime to the U.S. Army Criminal Investigation Division (CID), leading to the arrests of PFC Reno Flake and SPC B.B. Rush for the gang-rape and murders of Farrah and her family.
 Rob Devaney as SPC Lawyer McCoy, USA:  A married, college-educated soldier who enlisted in the U.S. Army, McCoy is disgusted by the conduct of his two fellow soldiers, PFC Reno Flake and SPC B.B. Rush.
 Ty Jones as MSG James Sweet, USA:  A tough veteran senior NCO on his third deployment to Iraq; he helps keeps his fellow soldiers in check. Highly respected by his men, when he is killed by an IED while on a foot patrol, the unit spirals downward without the presence of his strong leadership, inadvertently leading to the gang-rape and murders of Farrah and her family.
 Mike Figueroa as SGT Jim "Sarge" Vazquez, USA.
 Kel O'Neill as PFC Gabe Blix, USA:  A quiet, reserved soldier who spends his time reading books, most notably, Appointment in Samarra, by John O'Hara. He is the unit's K-9 handler, in charge of his bomb-sniffing dog, Kevin.
 Daniel Stewart Sherman as SPC B.B. Rush, USA:  One of the unit's two troublemakers, he spends his time with his best friend, PFC Reno Flake. He is the team's M249 SAW gunner.
 Patrick Carroll as PFC Reno "Slowflake" Flake, USA: One of the unit's two troublemakers, he spends his time with his partner-in-crime, SPC B.B. Rush. He was named by his father, an avid gambler, after the city of Reno, Nevada, as he was fond of the city. He has a brother named Vegas Flake, who was named by his father after the city of Las Vegas, Nevada, which he was also fond of.
 Happy Anderson as LTC Ford, USA: The unit's battalion commander.
 Zahra Zubaidi as Farrah, the victim.

Production
Principal photography commenced in Jordan in April 2007 and ended in May 2007.

A sneak preview of the film was also made available by HDNet to selected LodgeNet hotel entertainment systems.

Reception

Critical response
Redacted has received mixed reviews. Critic Michael Medved said "it could be the worst movie I've ever seen." Gary Thompson wrote in The Philadelphia Inquirer, "A repulsive movie, marred by grotesquely hammy acting and inscrutable presentation by Brian De Palma... This "typical" group of soldiers contains at least two sociopaths whose short fuses are activated by booze, pornography and violence. I found these characterizations to be nonsensical...Here, though, Redacted implies that atrocities occur with the tacit or overt support of the American people. If that were true, maybe the scene wouldn't seem so ridiculous.  Variety dismissed the film by stating, "Deeply felt but dramatically unconvincing "fictional documentary" — inspired by the March 2006 rape and killings by U.S. troops in Mahmoudiya, south of Baghdad — has almost nothing new to say about the Iraq situation  Phillip Martin in the Arkansas Democrat-Gazette called the film "clumsy, heavy-handed and sullenly self-congratulatory", and denounced the film as "this utterly surreal - and phony - picture show as obscene. It's a war crime of a petty order". Owen Gleiberman wrote in Entertainment Weekly, "why is Redacted such an excruciating experience? Because what happens within those formats is too fake to believe. The soldiers don't sound like soldiers", and concluded that the film was "so naive it's an embarrassment." Joe Morgenstern wrote in The Wall Street Journal, "The Americans are portrayed with varying degrees of loathsomeness, but there's not much variety in the film. It's all an awful aberration."  Kenneth Turan wrote in The Los Angeles Times, "By any rational standard, this film is kind of a mess. Even if you agree with its politics, you will probably weep at the ineptitude of it all." Tim Ronbbey's review in The Telegraph wrote, "Whatever your sympathy for its politics, it really is a monstrously bad film on every level."

However, Kyle Smith gave the movie a three-star (out of four) rating, saying, "(It) is a piece of anti-war propaganda whose aims I don't agree with, but it jolted me nonetheless."   reviewer Roger Ebert of the Chicago Sun Times gave it 3 and 1/2 stars (out of 4), stating that "the film is shocking, saddening and frustrating". In a critical piece about the depiction of war by Hollywood, journalist John Pilger described the film as "admirable".

On the review aggregator Rotten Tomatoes, the film has a 45% approval rating based on 109 reviews, with an average score of 5.29/10. The site's consensus reads: "Despite DePalma's obvious commitment to the material and passion for the issues at hand, Redacted suffers from stereotypical characters and a forced faux-doc style". On Metacritic, the film had an average score of 52 out of 100, based on 30 reviews.  The French film magazine Cahiers du cinéma chose it as the best film of 2008.

Box office
In spite of its modest budget, the film was a box office disaster. On the weekend of its U.S. release the movie was viewed by approximately 3,000 people, grossing only $25,628. Brandon Gray, publisher of Box Office Mojo, said the low per-theater ratio made the film a flop for De Palma. Richard Johnson ran an article titled "De Palma Iraq flick bombs". The Daily Telegraph also said that the theatrical release had "bombed" in the U.S. Total U.S. gross amounted to only $65,388. International release added $716,053 for a total worldwide gross of $781,441. The film's budget was $5 million.

Controversies

Relation to the real life incident
De Palma has been criticized for not including the fact that all of the soldiers involved in the real-life Mahmudiyah killings were prosecuted for the rape and murders perpetrated. The film ends with an official investigation underway, and does not depict a trial or conviction. Kurt Loder wrote in 2007 that "all five of the soldiers involved (in the rape and murder) were arrested and charged, and three have been tried and sentenced to 90, 100 and 110 years in prison." In addition, at the time of the film's release, the alleged ringleader, PFC Steven Dale Green, was being tried in a federal court in Kentucky, reportedly facing the death penalty. Since then all legal proceedings have completed.

However, De Palma pointed out that the film itself is fictional; HDNet's lawyers told him he could not use anything real about the true event – he had to fictionalize it, and was not allowed to refer to the real event in any way.

Political controversy
The film has attracted political controversy, with claims that, though the film is based on a real event, it portrays U.S. soldiers in a highly negative light, and has contributed to anti-American sentiment in Iraq and elsewhere; for example the murders by Arid Uka (see below). Sites like "boycottredacted.com" have accused Brian De Palma and the producer Mark Cuban of treason, and called for the general public to avoid watching the film. Republican Duncan Hunter, Ranking Member of the House Armed Services Committee complained in a letter to the chairman of the Motion Picture Association of America that the film "portrays American service personnel in Iraq as uncontrollable misfits and criminals" and "ignores the many acts of heroism performed by our Soldiers, Marines, Airmen and Sailors in Iraq." However, critic Kyle Smith opined that "De Palma isn't trying to insult the troops but illustrating how any war puts men in impossible situations." De Palma has stated that the film provides a realistic portrait of U.S. troops and how "the presentation of our troops has been whitewashed" by media. He expected that its graphic images would stir public debate about the conduct of U.S. soldiers.

Commentator Bill O'Reilly called for protests of Redacted and against Mark Cuban. O'Reilly claims that the film demeans U.S. soldiers and may incite violence against them, and he has called on ticketholders to bring signs to Dallas Mavericks games and all theaters showing the movie, stating 'Support the Troops'. Mark Cuban has responded, saying "The movie is fully pro-troops. The hero of the movie is a soldier who stands up for what is right in the face of adversity... I think that the concept that the enemy will see these films and use it as motivation is total nonsense. We have no plans of translating these movies to Arabic or other Middle Eastern languages...It's really easy to hate, its really hard to think issues through on their own merits. Anything that makes people think about issues is a good thing." Cuban also pointed out that, through the Fallen Patriots charitable fund that he set up and finances, over $2.5 million has been donated to soldiers in need. He went on to publish an email he received from a soldier wounded in Iraq, who wrote that "[Iraqis have] already formed their opinions of us and very little we do or say is going to change their minds. One movie, regardless of its subject matter, is not going to overcome their personal feelings about things like Abu-Ghraib, the criminal acts discussed in Redacted, their fears about security and lost loved ones".

Film reaction
During a New York Film Festival press conference for the film, De Palma mentioned that Redacted is itself redacted, due to Magnolia Pictures owner Mark Cuban "being disturbed" by the ending photo montage's imagery. A voice from the audience called out "That's not true"; with the speaker identifying himself as Eamonn Bowles, president of Magnolia Pictures. The producer of the film later appeared on stage to explain that the images were taken out not because they were disturbing, but because of concerns about the possibility that relatives of the dead persons appearing on the photographs might bring lawsuits for emotional distress and the like. Magnolia, he said, had been put in "an untenable legal position" making the movie uninsurable.

In an interview conducted the day after the uproar at the press conference, Cuban said, "There is no way I am going to include images of people who have been severely wounded or maimed and killed when the possibility exists that their families could unknowingly see the images and recognize a loved one." He also said that Magnolia had offered De Palma the option of buying the film back from the distributor in order to release it himself and "absorb 100 percent of the risk", but that De Palma did not accept. De Palma responded, "That's not true. He never offered me that opportunity, he never answered my phone calls."

2011 Frankfurt killing of U.S. airmen
On March 2, 2011, a man shot and killed two U.S. airmen at the Frankfurt Airport in Frankfurt, Germany, and wounded two others, maiming one. The suspect was identified as a 21-year-old man, Arid Uka, a German citizen of Albanian descent, who had worked at the airport. Uka claimed that he shot the airman because of a YouTube video which supposedly showed U.S. Army soldiers raping a child, but which was a clip from Redacted. In a confession, Uka stated that he shot at the U.S. airmen because he believed that they were going to commit additional rapes based on what the video footage from Redacted had portrayed.

See also

 Cinema of Jordan

References

External links
 
 
 
 
 
 
 Interview with Brian De Palma, from Fresh Air program, November 14, 2007

2007 films
Canadian war drama films
English-language Canadian films
Films about terrorism
Films directed by Brian De Palma
Films set in 2006
Films set in Iraq
Found footage films
Iraq War films
American war drama films
Films shot in Jordan
Films about rape
Fiction about murder
Films about the United States Army
2000s war drama films
2007 drama films
Magnolia Pictures films
2000s English-language films
2000s American films
2000s Canadian films